Lava Forks Provincial Park is a provincial park in northern British Columbia, Canada. It is the site of Canada's most recent volcanic eruption, which occurred in 1904 at Lava Fork (see The Volcano).

This park lies within the traditional territory of the Tahltan Nation.

Recreation and Tourism 
The park is offers spectacular scenery, with especially unique volcanic landforms and features from the 1904 eruption of The Volcano.  These features include lava-dammed lakes, ash dunes, pot holes containing crystal clear pools, and lava flows.

Walk-In/Backcountry/Wilderness Camping is permitted.

Fishing and angling is permitted provided the angler has the appropriate licenses.

Location and Access 
The park is only accessible by helicopter. Foot access is possible, but requires multiple days of hiking. There is no water or road access to the park.

The southern boundary of this park United States-Canada border, and is adjacent to the Tongass National Forest in Alaska.

See also
Border Lake Provincial Park
Craig Headwaters Protected Area
Volcanism of Western Canada

References

Provincial parks of British Columbia
Volcanism of British Columbia
Stikine Country
Boundary Ranges
2001 establishments in British Columbia
Protected areas established in 2001